Pinkeltje is a 1978 Dutch film directed by Harrie Geelen. The movie is based on the books of Dutch writer Dick Laan about the fictional character Pinkeltje (Fingerling in English).

Cast
Aart Staartjes as Pinkeltje (Fingerling)
Wieteke van Dort as Pinkelotje
Lex Goudsmit as Pinkelbaron Krikhaer
Emmy Lopes Dias as Pinkeldame Akeleitje
Bob de Lange as Dick Laan
Ab Hofstee as Ponkel Poortbewaarder
Will van Selst as Prins Pinkelbert

External links

1978 films
1970s Dutch-language films
Dutch fantasy films
Films based on Dutch novels
Dutch children's films
Films about gnomes